A quark star is a hypothetical type of compact, exotic star, where extremely high core temperature and pressure has forced nuclear particles to form quark matter, a continuous state of matter consisting of free quarks.

Background
Some massive stars collapse to form neutron stars at the end of their life cycle, as has been both observed and explained theoretically. Under the extreme temperatures and pressures inside neutron stars, the neutrons are normally kept apart by a degeneracy pressure, stabilizing the star and hindering further gravitational collapse. However, it is hypothesized that under even more extreme temperature and pressure, the degeneracy pressure of the neutrons is overcome, and the neutrons are forced to merge and dissolve into their constituent quarks, creating an ultra-dense phase of quark matter based on densely packed quarks. In this state, a new equilibrium is supposed to emerge, as a new degeneracy pressure between the quarks, as well as repulsive electromagnetic forces, will occur and hinder total gravitational collapse.

If these ideas are correct, quark stars might occur, and be observable, somewhere in the universe. Theoretically, such a scenario is seen as scientifically plausible, but it has been impossible to prove both observationally and experimentally, because the very extreme conditions needed for stabilizing quark matter cannot be created in any laboratory nor observed directly in nature. The stability of quark matter, and hence the existence of quark stars, is for these reasons among the unsolved problems in physics.

If quark stars can form, then the most likely place to find quark star matter would be inside neutron stars that exceed the internal pressure needed for quark degeneracy – the point at which neutrons break down into a form of dense quark matter. They could also form if a massive star collapses at the end of its life, provided that it is possible for a star to be large enough to collapse beyond a neutron star but not large enough to form a black hole.

If they exist, quark stars would resemble and be easily mistaken for neutron stars: they would form in the death of a massive star in a Type II supernova, be extremely dense and small, and possess a very high gravitational field. They would also lack some features of neutron stars, unless they also contained a shell of neutron matter, because free quarks are not expected to have properties matching degenerate neutron matter. For example, they might be radio-silent, or have atypical sizes, electromagnetic fields, or surface temperatures, compared to neutron stars.

History
The analysis about quark stars was first proposed in 1965 by Soviet physicists D. D. Ivanenko and D. F. Kurdgelaidze. Their existence has not been confirmed.

The equation of state of quark matter is uncertain, as is the transition point between neutron-degenerate matter and quark matter. Theoretical uncertainties have precluded making predictions from first principles. Experimentally, the behaviour of quark matter is being actively studied with particle colliders, but this can only produce very hot (above 1012 K) quark–gluon plasma blobs the size of atomic nuclei, which decay immediately after formation. The conditions inside compact stars with extremely high densities and temperatures well below 1012 K cannot be recreated artificially, as there are no known methods to produce, store or study "cold" quark matter directly as it would be found inside quark stars. The theory predicts quark matter to possess some peculiar characteristics under these conditions.

Formation

It is theorized that when the neutron-degenerate matter, which makes up neutron stars, is put under sufficient pressure from the star's own gravity or the initial supernova creating it, the individual neutrons break down into their constituent quarks (up quarks and down quarks), forming what is known as quark matter. This conversion might be confined to the neutron star's center or it might transform the entire star, depending on the physical circumstances. Such a star is known as a quark star.

Stability and strange quark matter
Ordinary quark matter consisting of up and down quarks has a very high Fermi energy compared to ordinary atomic matter and is stable only under extreme temperatures and/or pressures. This suggests that the only stable quark stars will be neutron stars with a quark matter core, while quark stars consisting entirely of ordinary quark matter will be highly unstable and re-arrange spontaneously.

It has been shown that the high Fermi energy making ordinary quark matter unstable at low temperatures and pressures can be lowered substantially by the transformation of a sufficient number of up and down quarks into strange quarks, as strange quarks are, relatively speaking, a very heavy type of quark particle. This kind of quark matter is known specifically as strange quark matter and it is speculated and subject to current scientific investigation whether it might in fact be stable under the conditions of interstellar space (i.e. near zero external pressure and temperature). If this is the case (known as the Bodmer–Witten assumption), quark stars made entirely of quark matter would be stable if they quickly transform into strange quark matter.

Strange stars

Quark stars made of strange quark matter are known as strange stars, and they form a subgroup under the quark star category.

Theoretical investigations have revealed that quark stars might not only be produced from neutron stars and powerful supernovas, they could also be created in the early cosmic phase separations following the Big Bang. If these primordial quark stars transform into strange quark matter before the external temperature and pressure conditions of the early Universe makes them unstable, they might turn out stable, if the Bodmer–Witten assumption holds true. Such primordial strange stars could survive to this day.

Characteristics
Quark stars have some special characteristics that separate them from ordinary neutron stars.

Under the physical conditions found inside neutron stars, with extremely high densities but temperatures well below 1012 K, quark matter is predicted to exhibit some peculiar characteristics. It is expected to behave as a Fermi liquid and enter a so-called color-flavor-locked (CFL) phase of color superconductivity, where "color" refers to the six "charges" exhibited in the strong interaction, instead of the two charges (positive and negative) in electromagnetism. At slightly lower densities, corresponding to higher layers closer to the surface of the compact star, the quark matter will behave as a non-CFL quark liquid, a phase that is even more mysterious than CFL and might include color conductivity and/or several additional yet undiscovered phases. None of these extreme conditions can currently be recreated in laboratories so nothing can be inferred about these phases from direct experiments.

If the conversion of neutron-degenerate matter to (strange) quark matter is total, a quark star can to some extent be imagined as a single gigantic hadron. But this "hadron" will be bound by gravity, rather than by the strong force that binds ordinary hadrons.

Observed overdense neutron stars
At least under the assumptions mentioned above, the probability of a given neutron star being a quark star is low, so in the Milky Way there would only be a small population of quark stars. If it is correct, however, that overdense neutron stars can turn into quark stars, that makes the possible number of quark stars higher than was originally thought, as observers would be looking for the wrong type of star.

A neutron star without deconfinement to quarks and higher densities cannot have a rotational period shorter than a millisecond; even with the unimaginable gravity of such a condensed object the centripetal force of faster rotation would eject matter from the surface, so detection of a pulsar of millisecond or less period would be strong evidence of a quark star.

Observations released by the Chandra X-ray Observatory on April 10, 2002 detected two possible quark stars, designated RX J1856.5-3754 and 3C 58, which had previously been thought to be neutron stars. Based on the known laws of physics, the former appeared much smaller and the latter much colder than it should be, suggesting that they are composed of material denser than neutron-degenerate matter. However, these observations are met with skepticism by researchers who say the results were not conclusive; and since the late 2000s, the possibility that RX J1856 is a quark star has been excluded.

Another star, XTE J1739-285, has been observed by a team led by Philip Kaaret of the University of Iowa and reported as a possible quark star candidate.

In 2006, You-Ling Yue et al., from Peking University, suggested that PSR B0943+10 may in fact be a low-mass quark star.

It was reported in 2008 that observations of supernovae SN 2006gy, SN 2005gj and SN 2005ap also suggest the existence of quark stars. It has been suggested that the collapsed core of supernova SN 1987A may be a quark star.

In 2015, Zi-Gao Dai et al. from Nanjing University suggested that Supernova ASASSN-15lh is a newborn strange quark star.

In 2022 it was suggested that GW190425, which likely formed as a merger between two neutron stars giving off gravitational waves in the process, could be a quark star.

Other theorized quark formations

Apart from ordinary quark matter and strange quark matter, other types of quark-gluon plasma might theoretically occur or be formed inside neutron stars and quark stars. This includes the following, some of which has been observed and studied in laboratories:

 Robert L. Jaffe 1977, suggested a four-quark state with strangeness (qs).
 Robert L. Jaffe 1977 suggested the H dibaryon, a six-quark state with equal numbers of up-, down-, and strange quarks (represented as uuddss or udsuds).
 Bound multi-quark systems with heavy quarks (QQ).
 In 1987, a pentaquark state was first proposed with a charm anti-quark (qqqs).
 Pentaquark state with an antistrange quark and four light quarks consisting of up- and down-quarks only (qqqq).
 Light pentaquarks are grouped within an antidecuplet, the lightest candidate, Θ+, which can also be described by the diquark model of Robert L. Jaffe and Wilczek (QCD).
 Θ++ and antiparticle −−.
 Doubly strange pentaquark (ssdd), member of the light pentaquark antidecuplet.
 Charmed pentaquark Θc(3100) (uudd) state was detected by the H1 collaboration.
 Tetraquark particles might form inside neutron stars and under other extreme conditions. In 2008, 2013 and 2014 the tetraquark particle of Z(4430), was discovered and investigated in laboratories on Earth.

See also

References

Sources and further reading

External links

Neutron Star/Quark Star Interior (image to print)
Whitfield,John; "Quark star glimmers",  Nature, 2002 April 11
"Debate sparked on quark stars", CERN Courier 42, #5, June 2002, page 13
Beck, Paul; "Wish Upon a Quark Star", Popular Science, June 2002

Krivoruchenko, M. I.; "Strange, quark, and metastable neutron stars" , JETP Letters, vol. 46, no. 1, 10 July 1987, pages 3-6 (page 6: Perhaps a 1,700-year-old quark star in SNR MSH 15-52)
Rothstein, Dave; "Curious About Astronomy: What process would bring about a quark star?", question #445, January 2003
Nemiroff, Robert; Bonnell, Jerry; "RX J185635-375: Candidate Quark Star", Astronomy Picture of the Day, NASA Goddard Space Flight Center, 2002 April 14
Anderson, Mark K.: Quarks or Quirky Neutron Stars?, Wired News, 2002 April 19
Boyce, Kevin; Still, Martin; "What is the news about a possible Strange Quark Star?", Ask an Astrophysicist, NASA Goddard Space Flight Center, 2002 April 12
Marquit, Miranda; "Seeing 'Strange' Stars", physorg.com, 2006 February 8
"Quark Stars Could Produce Biggest Bang", spacedaily.com, 2006 June 7
Niebergal, Brian: "Meissner Effect in Strange Quark Stars", Computational Astro-Physics Calgary Alberta, University of Calgary

Bryner, Jeanna; "Quark Stars Involved in New Theory of Brightest Supernovae", Space.com, 2008 June 3 (The first-ever evidence of a neutron star collapsing into a quark star is announced)
Cramer, John G.: "Quark Stars, Alternate View Column AV-114", Analog Science Fiction & Fact Magazine, November 2002

Star types

Exotic matter
Unsolved problems in physics
Hypothetical stars